During the Cuban revolution, escopeteros were essential scouts and pickets from the Sierra Maestra and other mountain ranges to the plains.  The "escopeteros" were responsible for semi-continuously holding terrain against smaller sized Batista patrols.  The escopeteros provided first alerts, communications, protected supply routes, provided essential intelligence and often captured weapons which were sent up to the mainline Castro forces in the high mountains.

Raúl Castro's mission to open a second front was in reality a mission to control an area already in possession of independent (“por la libre”) escopeteros.

It can be argued that Ernesto "Che" Guevara's overseas adventures failed at least in part because of the lack of equivalent escopetero support. In the series of articles written by the staff of Escambray (circa 1988 to 2007, Che entre nosotros. Supplement to Escambray)  the critical role of escopeteros is repeatedly mentioned.  Yet the Argentine guerrilla leader never appears to have planned the use of these essential, if poorly armed auxiliaries, in his operations overseas.

In the 1960s a number of escopeteros joined the opposition to Fidel Castro in the Escambray Rebellion.

Etymology
The original meaning of Escopeteros (shotgunners in Spanish) was those armed with a smoothbore long barrel firearm, sometimes a trabuco or blunderbuss, and has been used in this general context in histories of Spain and Latin America. It has been used to describe a pitcher in baseball, or a sniping journalist. It has also been used in the context of fighting on until victory: "El credo del escopetero".

References

Pérez Galdós, Benito El equipaje del rey José. Miguel D Cervantes Virtual Library www.cervantesvirtual.com

Cuban Revolution